Mika Sports Arena, is a multi-purpose sports arena located in the Shengavit District of Yerevan, the capital of Armenia. It has a capacity of 1,200 spectators.

The arena was constructed in 2009 by the Mika Corporation Ltd., the owners of the currently-defunct football club Mika FC. It is located near the Mika Stadium.

Mika Sports Arena is currently home to the Armenia national basketball team. It was also home to the short-lived Urartu BC basketball team during 2016.

History
The construction of the Mika Sports Complex was launched in 2006 on the grounds of the former Araks sports complex. The football stadium was completed in 2008, while the indoor sports arena was put in service by 2009.

The arena was owned by the Mika Corporation until 2014. However, on August 28, 2014, due to the accumulated debts of the owners, the ownership of the entire sport complex was transferred to the Government of Armenia for AMD 9.045 billion (US$22 million).

The arena is basically used for basketball matches, but it may also host handball, futsal and volleyball matches. 

Mika Arena is among the regular venues of the Pan-Armenian Games.

See also
 Sport in Armenia

References

Buildings and structures in Yerevan
Basketball venues in Armenia
Sports venues in Yerevan
Futsal clubs in Armenia